Billy Rogers (1905–1936) was a Welsh international footballer. He was part of the Wales national football team, playing 2 matches. He played his first match on 25 October 1930 against Scotland and his last match on 22 November 1930 against England.

Career 
He played 2 matches for the Wales national football team in the British Home Championship. He played his first match on 25 October 1930 against Scotland at Ibrox Stadium, drawing 1-1, and his second on 22 November 1930 against England at Wrexham's Racecourse Stadium, losing 0-4.

He had been previously picked for the FAW's uncapped tour of Canada in 1929.

He started his career as an amateur at Flint Town FC. He signed professional terms with Wrexham in 1926, and played for them from 1926 until 1931. He was a member of the FAW Welsh Cup winning side of 1931.

He subsequently played for Newport County, Bristol Rovers, and Leyton Orient (then known as Clapton Orient). He left Clapton Orient for Bangor City, a non-league team, at the end of the 1933-34 season.

Later life and death 
He was unknowningly diagnosed with Hodgkin's Disease in 1931, a terminal cancer, which contributed to his death in January 1936 from tuberculosis, aged 30.

During the period from 1931 to 1934 he continued to play professionally unaware of his condition, with only his wife being informed. He left behind his wife, Gwennith, and a two month old son Billy.

Honours 

Wrexham
Welsh Cup winner 1930–31

See also
 List of Wales international footballers (alphabetical)

References

1905 births
Welsh footballers
Wales international footballers
Place of birth missing
Year of death missing
Wrexham A.F.C. players

Association football wing halves
Bangor City F.C. players
Bristol Rovers F.C. players
Leyton Orient F.C. players
1936 deaths
Sportspeople from Wrexham